The femisphere is a solid that has one single surface, two edges, and four vertices.

Description 

The form of the femisphere is reminiscent of that of a sphericon but without straight lines. Instead of that, it has circular arcs of arbitrary radius. For this reason, when roll over a sphere, it cover the whole area of it in a revolution.

See also 
 Sphericon

References

External links 
 Femispheres images

Geometric shapes